Benito F. Carruthers (August 14, 1936 in Illinois, USA – September 27, 1983 in Los Angeles, California) was an American film actor, most notable for his role in John Cassavetes' debut feature film Shadows (1959). His other films included A High Wind in Jamaica (1965), Robert Aldrich's The Dirty Dozen (1967) as Glenn Gilpin, Fearless Frank (1967), To Grab the Ring (1968), The Lost Continent (1968), Riot (1969) as the unpredictable and psychotic Joe Surefoot, Man in the Wilderness (1971), and Universal Soldier (1971).

Personal life
He stood 6' 1". 

His first son, Caine Carruthers, was a bass player and was in various successful bands, including Katmandu and The Untouchables. Dijon Carruthers, his second son, had a very brief stint as Megadeth's first drummer in 1983. 

Carruthers died of liver failure in 1983 at the age of 47.

Musical career

As lead singer of Ben Carruthers and the Deep, he recorded the track Jack O' Diamonds in 1965, a song he co-wrote using lyrics given to him by Bob Dylan.

Filmography

References

External links

 Bob Dylan single

1936 births
1983 deaths
Male actors from Illinois
20th-century American male actors
American male film actors